Prag News also known as Prag is a 24×7 Assamese news channel. It is the oldest local news channel of Assam owned by A M Television Pvt. Ltd., based in Guwahati. It was launched on 4 March 2001 as a cable-based television channel. The channel covers local, national and international news and various other programs.

Key people
Dr Sanjive Narain, Chairman/Managing Director
Dr Akshata Narain, President
Prasanta Rajguru, Editor-in-Chief
Chandra Sekhar Sarmah, General Manager
Debajit Bhuyan, Associate Editor
Dilip Gope, Technical Head
Sanjit Das, IT Head
Santanu Mahanta, Deputy Editor
Rubul Gogoi, Chief Reporter
Jonjyoti Dutta Bora, senior political reporter
Samarjyoti Sarma, Journalist (Crime Reporter)

Awards
Awarded Best Mass Communication Award in the year 2003 & 2004.
Awarded by the Newspaper Association of India for Best Regional Channel for its contribution to the North East in 2011.
Winner of the NEBCUS Media Award 2011 & 2012.

See also
 List of Assamese-language television channels

References

External links
 

Indian direct broadcast satellite services
Television stations in Guwahati
24-hour television news channels in India
Assamese-language mass media
Assamese-language television channels
Television channels and stations established in 2000
Mass media in Assam